Ivory Coast, also known as Côte d'Ivoire, have appeared in the finals of the FIFA World Cup on three occasions in 2006, 2010 and 2014.

FIFA World Cup record

Côte d'Ivoire at the 2006 FIFA World Cup

Group C

Côte d'Ivoire at the 2010 FIFA World Cup

Group G

Côte d'Ivoire at the 2014 FIFA World Cup

Group C

Record players
Yaya Touré is the only Ivorian player who has been fielded in all nine matches from 2006 to 2014, making him the lone record player at World Cup finals for his country.

Top goalscorers

References

 
Countries at the FIFA World Cup
Fifa World Cup